Throughout the 19th century Spain made treaties of peace and recognition with each of the states established from its former colonies in Spanish America. The process was long drawn out, only being completed in 1904.

Background
After the Cortes of Cádizwhich served as a parliamentary Regency after Ferdinand VII was deposedwas established in 1810, many Spanish Empire territories decided to declare independence. When Ferdinand VII returned to the throne, he refused to accept these declarations and promised that he would retake all the territories, by force if necessary. There were diplomatic negotiations during the Trienio Liberal (1820-1823) but they were quashed by the return of absolutism. Ferdinand VII died in 1833, ending all military projects to reconquer Spanish America. In 1834 the Regnant Queen Isabella II of Spain decided that times had changed, that a more modern approach was needed, and started consulting other members of her government. On December 16, 1836 the Congress of Spain issued a decree authorizing the Spanish Government to renounce its territorial and sovereign claims over its domains in continental Americas, by concluding treaties with each of the states of Spanish America. Throughout the 19th century Spain made treaties of peace and recognition with each of newborn states. The process was less conflictive than the government thought, but several diplomatic hurdles meant that 68 years passed until the last treaty was signed.

Chronology 

The table lists the signing dates, not the ratification dates.

Notes

References

See also 
Hispanic America

Spanish American wars of independence